The Zurich Christmas Open is an annual chess tournament that takes place in Zurich, Switzerland. The tournament began in 1977 and has been held 38 consecutive times. In 2013, Polish Grandmaster Radosław Wojtaszek won the tournament. In 2014, German grandmaster Arkadij Naiditsch won the tournament.

The tournament has been won four times by Vladimir Tukmakov and Josef Klinger.

Winners 
{| class="wikitable"
!  #  !!  Year  !! Master Tournament
!Main Tournament
|-
|1
|1977
|Radovan Govedarica YUG
|only one Category
|-
|2
|1978
|Werner Hug SUI
|only one Category
|-
|3
|1979
|Petar Popovic YUG
|Trauth M. GER
|-
|4
|1980
|Radoslav Simic YUG
|Koronghy J. HUN
|-
|5
|1981
|Dragutin Sahovic YUG
|Payrits H. AUT
|-
|6
|1982
|Gyula Sax HUN
|Baldauf M. GER
|-
|7
|1983
|Jaime Sunye Neto BRA
|Maillard SUI
|-
|8
|1984
|Stefan Kindermann GER
|Bellamaric S. YUG
|-
|9
|1985
|Josef Klinger AUT
|Frick R. LIE
|-
|10
|1986
|Josef Klinger AUT
|Zaja I. YUG
|-
|11
|1987
|Lubomir Neckar CSR
|Potterat M. SUI
|-
|12
|1988
|Josef Klinger AUT
|Mella L. SUI
|-
|13
|1989
|Heinz Wirthensohn SUI
|Ribic K. YUG
|-
|14
|1990
|Josef Klinger AUT
|Kozarcanin S. YUG
|-
|15
|1991
|Jacob Murey FRA
|Fischer L. SUI
|-
|16
|1992
|Reinhard Lendwai AUT
|Fehr D. SUI
|-
|17
|1993
|Vadim Milov ISR
|Rosing H. GER
|-
|18
|1994
|Vladimir Tukmakov UKR
|Kajtez M. YUG
|-
|19
|1995
|Vladimir Tukmakov UKR
|Cruceli S. SUI
|-
|20
|1996
|Georg Siegel GER
|Gojani G. SUI
|-
|21
|1997
|Nedeljko Kelecevic BIH
|Bütler M. SUI
|-
|  22||1998|| Vladimir Tukmakov UKR
|Wittwer M. SUI
|-
|  23||1999|| Vladimir Tukmakov UKR
|Agushi A.  SUI
|-
|  24||2000|| Vladimir Epishin GER
|Jashari E.  SUI
|-
|  25||2001|| Yannick Pelletier SUI
|Hana A.  GER
|-
|  26||2002|| Yannick Pelletier SUI
|Tikvic N.  SUI
|-
|  27||2003|| Stanislav Savchenko UKR
|Remata V.  SUI
|-
|  28||2004|| Aloyzas Kveinys LIT
|Hirt M.  SUI
|-
|  29||2005|| Zoltán Varga HUN
|Pfau M.  GER
|-
|  30||2006|| Yannick Pelletier SUI
|Joller H.  SUI
|-
|  31||2007|| Florian Jenni SUI
|Gabersek A.  SUI
|-
|  32||2008||Héra Imre HUN
|Wegelin R.  SUI
|-
|  33||2009|| Leonid Milov GER
|Ristevski S.  SUI
|-
|  34||2010|| Georg Meier GER
|Stucki R.  SUI
|-
|  35||2011|| Igor Kurnosov RUS
|Künzli T.  SUI
|-
|  36||2012||Levente Vajda ROM
|Boskovic M.  SRB
|-
|  37||2013|| Radosław Wojtaszek POL
|Schweighoffer M.  SUI
|-
|  38||2014|| Arkadij Naiditsch  GER
|Grünberger M.  SRB
|-
|  39||2015|| Arkadij Naiditsch  GER
|Mansoor S.  SUI
|-
|40
|2016
|Nijat Abasov AZE
|Bhunjun R.  SUI
|-
|41
|2017
|GM Nisipeanu Liviu-Dieter GER
|Hauser R.  SUI
|-
|42
|2018
|Haik M. Martirosyan ARM
|Mesut Altok GER
|}

References

External links 
  (in German)

Chess competitions
Chess in Switzerland
Sports competitions in Zürich
International sports competitions hosted by Switzerland
Recurring sporting events established in 1977
1977 establishments in Switzerland